Zhenxi (Mandarin: 又新镇) is a town in Shawan District, Leshan, Sichuan, China. In 2010, Zhenxi had a total population of 4,608: 2,308 males and 2,228 females: 704 aged under 14, 3,155 aged between 15 and 65 and 749 aged over 65.

See also 
 List of township-level divisions of Sichuan

References 

Towns in Sichuan
Leshan